The Karimata Strait (alternatively,  Carimata or Caramata) is a wide strait that connects the South China Sea to the Java Sea, separating the Indonesian islands of Belitung to the west and Borneo (Kalimantan) to the east. It is the widest strait between the South China Sea and the Java Sea (other straits include the Bangka and Gaspar straits), but its numerous islands and reefs reduce its navigability. Its weather and current is influenced by the annual southeast and northwest monsoon.

It was used as an invasion route by the British fleet in the 1811 Invasion of Java in the Dutch East Indies. More recently, it was the site of the crash of Indonesia AirAsia Flight 8501, and the location of the 2016 edition of Sail Indonesia (dubbed "Sail Karimata Strait").

Geography 
The much narrower Gaspar Strait separates Belitung from Bangka Island to the west. Bangka lies close to the east coast of Sumatra, separated from it by the Bangka Strait. The Karimata Islands lie in the eastern part of the Karimata strait, northeast of Belitung, southwest of Maja Island and off-shore from the west coast of Borneo. Outside this main fairway, there are multiple navigable channels to the east of Karimata Islands or between the islands.

The rivers of Kapuas, Kendawangan, Pawan, and Sambas in Borneo, as well as Barumun and Musi in Sumatra flow to the strait.

Climate 
The southeast monsoon prevails in the strait from about the end of May, which comes with strong southeast or south-southeast wind, a dry weather, and mist that can obscure visibility. The northwest monsoon comes from the beginning of October, characterized by thunderstorms, rain and squalls alternating with calm days with fair weather. The biggest rainfall occur from November to February. From February, the weather becomes unpredictable because of the changing monsoon, before settling again around the end of May.

Currents and water transport 
The current strength of the strait vary depending on the monsoon wind. At the peak of either monsoon, the current can run up to  When the monsoon is light, "there is little or no current" and the direction may be subject to the tidal stream.

The strait's currents run between the South China Sea to its north and the Java Sea to its south. A 2007–2008 study by a group of Indonesian and Chinese researchers found that the transport volume averaged 500,000 m3/second (or 0.5 Sv) with a net southward direction (i.e. to the Java Sea). During the northern hemisphere winter, roughly during the northwest monsoon, water flowed southward averaging 2.7 Sv. The flow was reversed during the northern hemisphere summer, roughly during the southwest monsoon, with an average transport of 1.2 Sv.

History 

It was known to British sailors in the 18th and 19th centuries as the Caramata Passage. The strait was used as a route by the British fleet for its Invasion of Java (1811), sailing from the British base in Malacca to the island of Java, then part of the Dutch East Indies. Initially, the British were unsure of the strait's practicability, and hesitated between taking it or a northeast passage around the north of Borneo and through Makassar Strait. A report by Sir Thomas Stamford Raffles, then a British officer in Malacca, recommended taking the Karimata route, which he considered "less dangerous than tedious" than the northeast passage during that time of year. Raffles estimated that this journey would take the British fleet between a month and six weeks for "the fleet sailing in divisions". The British Governor-General of India The Lord Minto decided to take Raffles's suggestion over the objection of some naval officers. The fleet, numbering about 100 vessels and transporting about 11,000 troops, departed Malacca between 11 and 18 June 1811, and reached the coast of Java on 30 July after a smooth journey, exactly six weeks after Minto and Raffles' departure.

A 1915 publication by the United States Hydrographic Office commented that despite being much wider, the strait did not have as much traffic as the parallel Bangka or Gaspar Straits. The publication said that the advantage of its breadth was often outweighed by the danger posed by shoals in the strait, as well as its more irregular currents.

Recent events 
On 28 December 2014 Indonesia AirAsia Flight 8501 crashed into the strait after losing contact over the Java Sea when en route from Surabaya, East Java, Indonesia to Singapore. The crash also killed everyone onboard.

The 2016 installment of the sailing event Sail Indonesia was held in the strait was dubbed the "Sail Karimata Strait 2016". Four provinces of Indonesia located on either side of the strait—West Kalimantan, Jambi, Bangka Belitung and Riau Islands hosted the event, culminating in the peak event on 15 October on Datuk Island, North Kayong Regency, West Kalimantan.

References

Citations

Bibliography 
 
 
 
 
 
 
 

Straits of Indonesia
Java Sea
Straits of the South China Sea
Landforms of Sumatra
Landforms of Kalimantan